The Marambaia Formation is a geological formation of the Santos Basin offshore of the Brazilian states of Rio de Janeiro, São Paulo, Paraná and Santa Catarina. The formation is a seal and reservoir rock of the Atlanta and Oliva Fields in the Santos Basin.

Etymology 
The formation is named after Restinga da Marambaia, Rio de Janeiro.

Description 
The Marambaia Formation is the deeper lateral equivalent of the Iguape Formation. This formation in places can be found cropping out at sea bottom. The depositional environment is thought to be talus and open marine basin. Biostratigraphic data indicate a Tertiary age.

The formation is a seal, and reservoir rock in the Atlanta and Oliva Fields of the Santos Basin.

See also 

 Campos Basin

References

Bibliography 
 
 
 
 

Geologic formations of Brazil
Santos Basin
Neogene Brazil
Paleogene Brazil
Neogene System of South America
Paleogene System of South America
Shale formations
Marl formations
Sandstone formations
Deep marine deposits
Turbidite deposits
Reservoir rock formations
Petroleum in Brazil
Formations
Formations
Formations
Formations
Tupi–Guarani languages